Nikos Soultanidis (born 2 January 1977) is a Greek former professional footballer who played as a forward.

Career
Born in Komotini, Soultanidis began his professional career with Kilkisiakos F.C. before moving to Iraklis Thessaloniki F.C., Kastoria F.C., Agrotikos Asteras F.C. and Kavala FC
In February 2005, Soultanidis scored two goals against Olympiakos F.C. in a 2–1 victory at the first leg, for the Greek Cup.

References

External links
Profile at Onsports.gr

1977 births
Living people
Footballers from Komotini
Greek footballers
Iraklis Thessaloniki F.C. players
AO Chania F.C. players
Kastoria F.C. players
Agrotikos Asteras F.C. players
Kavala F.C. players
Panthrakikos F.C. players
Association football forwards